is a former Japanese football player.

Club statistics

References

External links

1982 births
Living people
Chuo University alumni
Association football people from Gunma Prefecture
Japanese footballers
J1 League players
J2 League players
Shonan Bellmare players
Association football defenders
Iwaki FC managers
People from Shibukawa, Gunma